Guitar Boogie may refer to:

 Guitar Boogie (album), by Eric Clapton, Jeff Beck, and Jimmy Page
 "Guitar Boogie" (song), by Arthur Smith, covered as "Guitar Boogie Shuffle" by The Virtues